On July 4, 1975, a Palestinian terrorist exploded a booby-trapped refrigerator which contained five kilograms of explosives inside an appliance store at Zion Square in the center of Jerusalem, killing 15 people and wounding 77.

The attack
A Jewish passerby, Shabtai Levi, helped a Palestinian man bring a booby-trapped refrigerator into an appliance store at Zion Square in the center of Jerusalem. The refrigerator aroused the suspicions of Esther Landner and Yehuda Warshovsky, who worked near Zion Square. Landner called the police but as she was answering their questions, the refrigerator blew up.

Fatalities
Among the dead were Rivka (née Soifer) Ben-Yitzhak, 35, an American citizen, and her husband, Michael, who left behind two small children. The Ben-Yitzhak Award, presented annually to an outstanding children's book illustrator by the Israel Museum, was established in their memory. Daoud Khoury, an Arab accountant at the King David Hotel, was also killed in the attack.

Perpetrators
Palestinian militant group PLO claimed responsibility for the attack. Later on it was revealed that the attack was executed by the Arab-American Ahmed Jabara, aka Abu Sukar, whom originated from Turmus Ayya. Jabara was assisted by Bassem Tabila of Nablus, who fled to Jordan before he could be arrested.

Following an investigation by Shin Bet and the Israel Police, Jabara was arrested and put on trial before a military court in June 1977. He was convicted and sentenced to life in prison and an additional 30 years.

In 2003, Ahmed Jabara was released from prison after having served 27 years, as a gesture of the Israeli government toward Yasser Arafat. Shortly after his release, Jabara called for the kidnapping of Israeli soldiers at a rally in Bethlehem that was widely covered by the Palestinian media. Arafat subsequently appointed him adviser on prisoner affairs. Jabara died of a heart attack in Ramallah on July 17, 2013, at age 78.

See also
 Palestinian political violence

References

External links
 13 killed by bomb in Israel - published on The Baltimore Sun on July 5, 1975
 13 Die, Scores Hurt in Jerusalem Blast - published on the New York Times on July 5, 1975
 13 Die in Jerusalem Bombing - published on the Los Angeles Times on July 5, 1975

Mass murder in 1975
Israeli–Palestinian conflict
Terrorist attacks attributed to Palestinian militant groups
Terrorist incidents in Jerusalem
20th century in Jerusalem
Zion Square
Terrorist incidents in Asia in 1975
1970s in Jerusalem
Terrorist incidents in Jerusalem in the 1970s